Maski is a town and an archaeological site in the Raichur district of the state of Karnataka, India. It lies on the bank of the Maski river which is a tributary of the Tungabhadra. Maski derives its name from Mahasangha or Masangi . The site came into prominence with the discovery of a minor rock edict of Emperor Ashoka by C. Beadon in 1915. It was the first edict of Emperor Ashoka that contained the name Ashoka in it instead of the earlier edicts that referred him as Devanampiye piyadasi. This edict was important to conclude that many edicts found earlier in the Indian sub-continent in the name of Devanampiye piyadasi, all belonged to Emperor Ashoka. The edict is etched on a rock-face of Durgada-gudda, one of the gneissic outcrops that are present in the site.

Maski is also the place on the Raichur Doab which was also under the hegemony of the imperial Chola empire and it was here that Rajendra Chola I defeated Jayasimha II, the Western Chalukya ruler in battle in 1019-1020 AD.

Excavation history
Maski was studied initially by Robert Bruce Foote in 1870 and 1888. In 1915, C. Beadon, a mining engineer, discovered Ashoka's rock edict here. In 1935–37, the archaeological department of Hyderabad state explored this region and in 1954, Amalananda Ghosh excavated this place on behalf of the Archaeological Survey of India.

Minor Rock Edict of Ashoka
The Maski version of Minor Rock Edict No.1 was historically especially important in that it confirmed the association of the title "Devanampriya" ("Beloved-of-the-Gods") with Ashoka:

Other findings
The excavations indicated that the region was occupied across four different cultural periods; Period I: Neolithic-Chalcolithic, Period II: Megalithic, Period III: Early historical and Period IV: Medieval. In Period I, microliths and blades made of agate, chert, carnelian and opal are found. Ornamental beads of agate, coral, shell and other materials are also found. Dull-grey ware and painted-buff ware pottery are found, some of which were painted with linear patterns. Animal remains of cattle, buffalo, sheep and goat are also found. Period II saw the introduction of iron and five different forms of burials were discovered. Lances, ferrules, daggers and arrowheads were found, apart from beads of gold and terracotta objects. The pottery of Period II consisted of the megalithic red-and-black ware, all-black ware and red-slipped ware, some of which had graffiti on them. Coins were discovered in the Period III which also saw the use of Russet-coated painted ware. The earliest specimens of Indian glass were also discovered at Maski. A cylinder seal has also been found here.

Transport
Maski is well connected by road. It lies on Bangalore-Gulbarga road. Maski ia around 425 km from Bangalore, 80 km from Raichur and 24 km from Sindhanur. Maski can be reached by KSRTC buses from all Major towns and cities in Karnataka. Raichur Junction, 80 km away, is the nearest railway station and Gangavathi Approximate driving distance between Gangavathi and Maski is 74 km or 46 miles.

Image gallery

See also
 Hatti Gold Mines 
 Mudgal
 Raichur
 Hampi

References

 

 
 
 
 
 
 

Cities and towns in Raichur district
History of Karnataka
Archaeological sites in Karnataka
 Taluks of Karnataka